SORAG is a 1981 role-playing game supplement for Traveller published by Paranoia Press.

Contents
SORAG is a book that details SORAG, the Scientific, Operations, Research and Administration Group - the intelligence and counter-intelligence agency of the Zhodani Consulate. SORAG is a supplement describing the Zhodani espionage service, with details of its organization and function.  It includes rules for SORAG characters, covering background, new skills (such as cryptography, counterfeiting, and torture), and new equipment.

Publication history
SORAG was written by Chuck Kallenbach II and published in 1981 by Paranoia Press as a 28-page book.

Reception
William A. Barton reviewed SORAG in The Space Gamer No. 43. Barton commented that "Unless the idea of Zhodani intelligence agents waiting around every corner for your hapless characters turns you off, you should find SORAG an intriguing addition to the Traveller mythos."

Nelson Cunnington reviewed the supplement for White Dwarf, giving the supplement an overall rating of 9. Cunnington commented that "I feel Sorag is the best thing to come out of Paranoia Press so far, and hard to top [...] I can only recommend Sorag."

Reviews
 Different Worlds #15 (Oct., 1981)

References

Role-playing game supplements introduced in 1981
Traveller (role-playing game) supplements